Cinderella is Dead is a 2020 young adult book by Kalynn Bayron. The novel is focused on Sophia Grimmins, a queer teenager living in the same world as Cinderella, 200 years after her death, when coming of age are forced to attend balls to be chosen as wives of men they've never met.

Plot summary 
The plot has parallels to the original story of Cinderella. The King of Mersailles holds an annual ball that young women are required to attend. At the ball, men choose the young women that they want as brides. If a woman is not chosen as a bride for three years, she forfeits her right to get married and loses her connections to her community. Some young women, however, end up in bad marriages and some would rather not get married at all.

The lead character, Sophia, wants to live with her childhood best friend, Erin, whom she wants to marry, but to do so they will need to escape Mersailles. Erin is not sure she wants to escape. Instead, Sophia is befriended by Constance (a descendant of the stepsisters in the original story). Constance recounts the history of Cinderella from her perspective—one that is very different from how the fairy tale is usually told. Sophia and Constance join forces to visit the fairy godmother and to confront the King Manford.

Reception 
Melanie Kirkwood, for The Booklist, calls the novel a "fast-paced read" and says that Bayron's take on the Cinderella tale "will forever change how readers perceive fairy tales." Kirkwood also commented on the main character construed by the author, saying her courage and skill "alongside her stereotype-shattering Black girl beauty will have readers rooting for her." Kirkus Reviews called it a "promising debut" and praised the setting chosen by the author, also saying that "the twists and turns will keep readers in suspense."

In a review for The National of Scotland, McLaughlin called the book "the perfect mix" of a dystopian world and a new take on a classic fairy tale. Writing for The School Librarian, Sammie Boon criticizes the presence of some plot holes in the story, as well as the "ending which felt a bit too neat". Both Boon and McLaughlin called attention to the importance of the subjects tackled by Bayron.

As recently as 2022, Cinderella is Dead has been involved in a number of censorship challenges in schools throughout the United States, including but not limited to Granbury, Texas, and San Antonio, Texas. In Granbury, the title was included on a list of 134 books that have been challenged by the independent school district and consequently removed by the committee. In San Antonio, the title was removed alongside a list of over 400 books after Rep. Matt Krause published a list of books that he deemed would cause students "discomfort" for addressing sexuality and race. In response to the book's negative reception, Bayron commented, "My biggest fear is that these young readers are going to be denied access to stories about people who look like them, who love like them. They're who I write for. That's my job. That's who I create these stories for, and knowing that they're being kept from them is very disheartening."

References 

2020 children's books
Children's books with LGBT themes
Works based on Cinderella
LGBT-related children's novels
2020s LGBT novels
Bloomsbury Publishing books